The Cuttack Bhubaneswar Metro is a rapid transit system proposed for the cities Cuttack and Bhubaneswar, Odisha, India.

History
On 27 July 2010, the state transport department said that it had asked  Delhi Metro Rail Corporation (DMRC) to conduct a survey on the possibility of connecting Bhubaneswar and Cuttack by metro rail. On 8 January 2013, E. Sreedharan, principal advisor of Delhi Metro Rail Corporation (DMRC), said that a metro rail was unsuitable for Bhubaneswar, because it was more suited for cities with more than 2 million in population. He suggested that Bhubaneswar should invest in bus rapid transit system or high speed tramway system instead.

On 9 January 2013, Engineering Projects India Ltd. gave a proposal to the state government about a monorail project between Cuttack and Bhubaneswar. On 23 August 2014, the state government signed a contract with Balaji Railroad Systems Ltd. (BARSYL) for preparation of a detailed project report for a mass rapid transit system (MRTS) between Bhubaneswar and Cuttack covering 30 km. BARSYL would get  crore for preparation of the plan to be submitted in ten months.

In January 2013, E. Sreedharan stated that Bhubaneswar not yet ready for metro rail citing its low population. Orissa Chief Secretary Aditya Prasad Padhi stated in February 2017 that there was no immediate feasibility for a metro rail system in Bhubaneswar, and a bus rapid transit system would be developed instead.

In January 2018, Odisha CM demanded for Metro rail connectivity between Cuttack and Bhubaneswar. also in June 2019, Governor of Odisha said that the state government will attempt to connect the heritage silver city of Cuttack with smart city Bhubaneswar by Metro train.

In March 2021, the Odisha Housing & Urban Development Minister said that Metro rail service is not feasible in Odisha for the next 20 Years. According to a survey conducted by the government, Metro train service not feasible in Bhubaneswar and Cuttack until 2041.

Expenditure
BARSYL will be paid  crore for the detailed project report. The cost per kilometer has been estimated at  crore. The project is expected to cost  crore, half of which will be paid by the central government under the Urban Transport Planning scheme and the other half by the state government.

Network
The project will initially cover the 30 km between the Bhubaneswar and Cuttack. It will serve the Bhubaneswar-Cuttack Urban Complex (BCUC).

See also
 Bhubaneswar
 Cuttack

References

Proposed monorails in India
Transport in Bhubaneswar
Transport in Cuttack